"You Don't Know" is a 1999  song recorded by 702, it was released as the second single from their second studio album 702. The song was written and produced by Danish record producers Soulshock & Karlin, it was a moderate hit in Europe peaking within the top 40 in the UK.

Background
When recording their sophomore album the girls of 702 wanted to record songs that they actually liked and when they heard the demo tape of "You Don't Know", they didn't like it. According to Lemisha, "Honestly, to tell you the truth, when we heard the demo, we didn't like the song, but at the urging of Motown President Kedar Massenburg, it made the cut". She continued saying, "We had a really bad vibe about the song ... and Kedar ... was like, 'Well, you guys are doing the song.' And that's when we had to trust people who know more (about the music industry) than us and who we're trying to learn from,".

Music and lyrics
Described as being a "futuristic track" by Billboard "You Don't Know" is a song about a girl liking a boy too much explained by 702 group member Irish." According to Irish  "It's just one of those kinda songs [which says] 'I think I'm going crazy. I like you too much."

Music video 
The official music video for "You Don't know" was directed by Bille Woodruff and it features the ladies in a futuristic setting throughout the video. The video starts with the girls dressed as robots. While they are moving robotically, various clips from the music video; are shown on medium TV screens. On one TV screen, Meelah is wearing a white dress; as she sings, white doves fly above her in the background. The clip then reverts to the scene of the girls dressed as robots. During the chorus, the other girls of 702 are shown in similar rooms as Meelah, with Irish wearing a blue outfit and Lemisha wearing a black outfit. The robotic scenes are shown simultaneously in between each girl's solo room scenes. The following video scene; shows the three girls walking in the woods. While wandering the woods, they come across a cave and go in. After looking around the cave, they sing the song's chorus while standing around. While the girls are in the cave, three guys walk around the woods with a tracking device, looking for the girls. They find the girl's secret location and go inside the cave, but the girls are not there anymore. In between that scene, a new clip emerges with the girls wearing white jumpsuits, and it's shown in small doses for the remainder of the video. The final scene reverts to the first scene with the girls dressed as robots; the video ends with them walking underwater. The You Don't know music video was ranked at number 5 on Bustle's "22 Weird 90's Music Videos That You Somehow Managed To Forget About" List.

The video made its premiere on video stations like BET on the week ending August 15, 1999. It later premiered on The Box on the week ending August 22, 1999.

Chart performance
"You Don't Know?" peaked at No. 50 on the Hot R&B/Hip-Hop Songs on August 28, 1999  The song also peaked within the top 40 on the Official Charts in the UK at number 36 in November 1999. The song also charted in other places in Europe such as Germany and The Netherlands where it charted at number 90 and 60 respectively in those two regions.

Track listings

Charts

References

702 (group) songs
Songs written by Kenneth Karlin
1999 songs
Songs written by Soulshock